Javad Ghorab  is an Iranian former football midfielder who played for Iran in the 1972 Summer Olympics . He also played for Taj SC.

Record at Olympic Games

Honours

Club

Asian Club Championship
1970: Winner
1971: Third place
Takht Jamshid Cup
Winner: 1
1974–75 with Taj SC

Runner up: 1
1973–74 with Taj SC

References

External links
 Javad Ghorab at FIFA.com
 
 

Iran international footballers
Iranian footballers
1949 births
Living people
Olympic footballers of Iran
Footballers at the 1972 Summer Olympics
1972 AFC Asian Cup players
Esteghlal F.C. players
Footballers at the 1970 Asian Games
Association football midfielders
Asian Games competitors for Iran